Kal Kados, Corapci Han Synagogue is a synagogue in Istanbul, Turkey. Located in an historic office building built by Russian Jews in the 1880s with the help of Count de Kamondo, the synagogue is open for daily prayers during weekdays.

See also
 History of the Jews in Turkey
 List of synagogues in Turkey

References and notes

External links
 Chief Rabbinate of Turkey
 Shalom Newspaper - The main Jewish newspaper in Turkey

Ashkenazi Jewish culture in Turkey
Fatih
Russian diaspora in Turkey
Russian-Jewish diaspora in Asia
Russian-Jewish diaspora in Europe
Synagogues in Istanbul
Synagogues completed in the 1880s
19th-century religious buildings and structures in Turkey